"Tryin' to Get Over You" is a song written and recorded by American country music singer Vince Gill.  It was released in January 1994 as the fifth single from his album I Still Believe in You.  The song reached the top of the Billboard Hot Country Singles & Tracks (now Hot Country Songs) chart. It was also Gill's last number one single until twenty-three years later, when he reached number one with a guest vocal on Chris Young's "Sober Saturday Night" in March 2017.

Music video
The music video was directed by John Lloyd Miller and premiered in early 1994. Filmed in black-and-white with a grainy texture, it features a cameo from Gill's then-wife, Janis. It begins with a still shot of Gill's and Janis' silhouette. The action begins as she instantly leaves him. The remainder of the video shows Gill in a bar and walking along a city street on a rainy night surrounded by various people and alone trying to cope with his sadness. Shots of Janis on her separate path (such as in a cafe and in the back seat of a cab driving away) looking blank-faced are also seen. It ends with a shot of Gill's silhouette again, this time alone.

Chart performance
"Tryin' to Get Over You" debuted at number 63 on the U.S. Billboard Hot Country Singles & Tracks for the week of January 8, 1994.

Year-end charts

References

1992 songs
Vince Gill songs
Songs written by Vince Gill
Song recordings produced by Tony Brown (record producer)
1994 singles
MCA Records singles
1990s ballads
Country ballads
Torch songs
Black-and-white music videos
Music videos directed by John Lloyd Miller